Sir Frederick Lucas Cook, 2nd Baronet (21 November 1844 – 21 May 1920)  was the second holder of the Cook Baronetcy, the head of the family textile-trading company, and a Conservative Party politician.

Life
The son of Sir Francis Cook, 1st Bt and Emily Martha Lucas, he was educated at Harrow School, succeeded to his father's titles in 1901 and was married on 7 January 1868 to Mary Anne Elizabeth Cotton, daughter of Richard Payne Cotton. He was succeeded in his titles  by his only son Herbert.

He was elected at the 1895 general election as Member of Parliament (MP) for the Kennington division of Lambeth in South London, and held the seat until his defeat at the 1906 general election. He was also a deputy lieutenant of the City of London.

Cook is buried in Richmond Cemetery.

References

Sources
http://thepeerage.com/p25104.htm#i251031

External links 
 

1844 births
1920 deaths
Baronets in the Baronetage of the United Kingdom
People educated at Harrow School
Conservative Party (UK) MPs for English constituencies
UK MPs 1895–1900
UK MPs 1900–1906
Burials at Richmond Cemetery